Teasing Master Takagi-san is an anime series adapted from the manga of the same title by Sōichirō Yamamoto. The third season was officially announced in September 2021 after it was first teased with the release of the sixteenth volume of the manga, alongside an animated film. The third season aired on the Super Animeism block on MBS and TBS, and other networks from January 8 to March 26, 2022. The opening theme is  performed by Yuiko Ōhara. Muse Communication secured the distribution rights for the third season in Southeast Asia. On December 28, 2021, Sentai Filmworks announced it had acquired the rights to the third season and the film for worldwide distribution excluding Asia, and is streaming it on HIDIVE.


Episode list

Notes

References

External links
  
 

3
2022 Japanese television seasons